Heuston Gate was a proposed skyscraper development for Dublin in Ireland. The development was planned to include a 32 storey tower. Designed by Paul Keogh Architects, the tower was proposed by the Office of Public Works and intended as part an urban renewal project at Military Road in Kilmainham.

Originally proposed in 2004, it was planned to construct the tower on the western fringe of Dublin city centre facing onto Heuston Station (for which the development was named). The proposal was to create a "residential, office, cultural and amenity development".

It was announced in 2008 that the project would not proceed.

References

Buildings and structures in Dublin (city)
Unbuilt buildings and structures in the Republic of Ireland